Jorge León Llames Gutiérrez (born October 17, 1978, in Piedras Blancas, Asturias), known as Jorge Llames, is a Spanish sport shooter. He won a bronze medal in the men's rapid fire pistol at the 2011 ISSF World Cup series in Changwon, South Korea, with a total score of 580 points and a bonus of 20 from the final, earning him a spot on the Spanish team for the Olympics. Llames is also a member of Club Ensidesa Trasona in Asturias, and is coached and trained by Cezary Staniszewski.

Llames represented Spain at the 2012 Summer Olympics in London, where he competed in the men's 25 m rapid fire pistol. Llames scored a total of 579 targets (288 on the first stage and 291 on the second) in the qualifying rounds by two inner tens behind South Korea's Kim Dae-Yoong, finishing in eleventh place.

Notes

References

External links
 
 
 
 
 Jorge Llames official website 

1978 births
Living people
Spanish male sport shooters
Olympic shooters of Spain
Shooters at the 2012 Summer Olympics
Shooters at the 2016 Summer Olympics
Sportspeople from Asturias
European Games competitors for Spain
Shooters at the 2015 European Games